Richard Sagrits (19 December 1910 in Karepa – 11 December 1968 in Tallinn) was an Estonian painter.

Sagrits (with Elmar Kits and Evald Okas) painted the ceiling of the Estonian National Opera in the style of Socialist Realism in 1947.

His works can be seen in the Karepa Kalame Farm Museum, Karepa,  Vihula Parish, Lääne-Viru County, Estonia.

References

External links

1910 births
1968 deaths
People from Haljala Parish
People from the Governorate of Estonia
Modern painters
20th-century Estonian painters
20th-century Estonian male artists
Soviet painters